Earthquake Research Institute, University of Tokyo (ERI; 東京大学地震研究所 Tokyo Daigaku Jishin Kenkyu-jo) is an institute in affiliation with University of Tokyo. It was founded in 1925. Many fellows research on various topics about Seismology and volcanology. The Institute is represented on the national Coordinating Committee for Earthquake Prediction.

Organizational structure
Research Division
Division of Earth Mechanics
Division of Geodynamics
Division of Monitoring and Computational Geoscience
Division of Disaster Mitigation Science
Affiliated Center
Earthquake Prediction Research Center
Earthquake Observation Center
Earthquake Information Center
Volcano Research Center
Ocean Hemisphere Research Center
Others
Outreach Program
Office of International Earthquake and Volcano Research Promotion

Former directors
Kiyoo Mogi

References

External links
ERI Official Website

Research institutes in Japan
University of Tokyo
Earth science research institutes